Lon Currey Hinkle (born July 17, 1949) is an American professional golfer who has played on both the PGA Tour and the Champions Tour.

Hinkle was born in Flint, Michigan. He attended Santana High School in Santee, California, graduating in 1967.  He then attended San Diego State University, where he was a member of the golf team. He turned pro and joined the PGA Tour in 1972.

Hinkle won three tournaments in his career on the PGA Tour, all of which came in the late 1970s. In 1979, he earned $247,693, finished 3rd on the money list, and won two Tour events, including the World Series of Golf. That year in the first round of the U.S. Open at Inverness Club he took a shortcut, cutting the dogleg on the par-5 8th hole by hitting onto the 17th fairway. Overnight, USGA officials planted a tree (known ever afterwards as The Hinkle Tree) to block the shortcut. His best finish in a major was a T-3 at both the U.S. Open and the PGA Championship in 1980. During his career on the PGA Tour, he had more than 50 top-10 finishes. He also played on the European Tour occasionally. Though he never won he finished runner-up at the 1975 German Open and 1980 European Open.

In 1981, Hinkle won the World Long Drive Championship.

After turning 50 in 1999, Hinkle joined the Champions Tour. His best finish at that level is a T-12 in the 2000 Audi Senior Classic.

Hinkle lives in Bigfork, Montana in the northwest corner of the state.

Professional wins (5)

PGA Tour wins (3)

PGA Tour playoff record (1–2)

Ben Hogan Tour wins  (1)

Other wins (1)
1978 JCPenney Mixed Team Classic (with Pat Bradley)

Results in major championships

WD = withdrew
CUT = missed the half-way cut
"T" indicates a tie for a place

Summary

Most consecutive cuts made – 6 (1982 U.S. Open – 1987 PGA)
Longest streak of top-10s – 1 (four times)

Results in The Players Championship

CUT = missed the halfway cut
"T" indicates a tie for a place

See also
1972 PGA Tour Qualifying School graduates
1991 PGA Tour Qualifying School graduates

References

External links

American male golfers
San Diego State Aztecs men's golfers
PGA Tour golfers
PGA Tour Champions golfers
Golfers from Michigan
Sportspeople from Flint, Michigan
Golfers from San Diego
People from Bigfork, Montana
1949 births
Living people